Ᵽ (minuscule: ᵽ) or "p with stroke" is a letter of the Latin alphabet, formed from P with the addition of a stroke, usually through the bowl but sometimes through the descender. It is used in some phonetic transcription systems, such as the Americanist phonetic notation, to represent a fricative .

In 1987 ᵽ was adopted for writing the Tanimuca-Retuarã language, where it represents either a fricative or a stop depending on the dialect.

PotCoin uses a design of the P with stroke as a symbol of its digital cryptocurrency.

Encoding
The minuscule form,  was added to Unicode 4.1 in 2005, while the majuscule  was added to version 5.0 in 2006.

Latin Alphabets

Phonetic transcription symbols
Latin letters with diacritics